Plunk is a Belgian comic series created by Luc Cromheecke and Laurent Letzer, and published by Dupuis. So far three albums have appeared.

The comics are pantomime comic/gag-a-day short stories (most often between one and four pages long) about the misadventures of Plunk, a little pink alien with green trousers and a green hat from the planet Smurk.

History 
Plunk was first created in the late 1980s for the Belgian Centre for Comic Strip Art as a fictional example of the merchandising that can be produced with successful comic figures like The Smurfs or Peanuts. In 1990, he became a character in Taco Zip, the comic strip by Cromheecke which appeared at the time in the Dutch newspaper De Volkskrant. These comic strips were later reprinted in four albums and twenty years later in one collection.

A decade later, Plunk became the central figure in a series of very short animated movies, commissioned by VTM, the major Flemish commercial TV station. The plan abandoned before any of these shorts were ever broadcast though.

In 2007, Plunk was again revived, this time to get his own series. The Plunk stories are prepublished in Spirou magazine (French language), in  Gazet van Antwerpen and Het Belang van Limburg (Dutch language), and sometimes on the Plunk-blog maintained by Cromheecke.

The first two albums of Plunk were nominated at the Stripschapprizes (the major comics awards in the Netherlands) for the Award for Best Dutch Language Youth Comic in 2007 and 2008.

Since 2008, Plunk is the mascotte of the award for the best Dutch language short comic story, the Plastieken Plunk, awarded by the comics magazines Plots and Pulp Deluxe. From 2004 until 2007 this award was given by Pulp Deluxe alone, but it was renamed after Plots joined.

Plastieken Plunk winners
2004: Steven Dupré
2005: Brecht Evens
2006: Filip Strubbe and Ivan Claeys
2007: Kristof Spaey and Steven Dupré 
2008: Pinda
2009: Brecht Evens
2010: Erwin Kho
2011: Frederik Van Den Stock
2012: Martijn Van Santen
2013: Leslie Saurus
2014: Thijs Desmet
2015: Jan van Doornspeek
2016: Jonas Sysmans

Plastieken Plunk audience award
2008: Swahili and Peter Moerenhout
2009: Pieter Rosseel and Peter Moerenhout
2010: Bartosz Sztybor and others
2011: Merel Cremers
2012: Mathias van den Berge en Bram Vaassen
2013: Jeroen Funke
2014: Bram Algoed
2015: Floris De Smedt
2016: Dennis Marien

Notes

External links
The Plunk Blog, mainly in English
Example of a Plunk comic, at the Dupuis website
Interview with the StripSpeciaalZaak website
Plastieken Plunk

1989 comics debuts
Belgian comic strips
Comics about extraterrestrial life
Dupuis titles
Gag-a-day comics
Pantomime comics